Paratobias is a monotypic genus of Central American crab spiders containing the single species, Paratobias championi. It was first described by Frederick Octavius Pickard-Cambridge in 1900, and it has only been found in Panama. Eugène Simon synonymized it with Stephanopis in 1903 due to several similarities to the genus, but Machado & Teixeira revalidated the genus in 2021, citing the distinctive trapezoidal shape of the abdomen as well as several differences in eye morphology.

See also
 Stephanopis
 Coenypha
 List of Thomisidae genera

References

Monotypic Thomisidae genera
Taxa named by Frederick Octavius Pickard-Cambridge
Endemic fauna of Panama